The 2007 South African public servants' strike was a general strike of workers in the public sector of South Africa. It was led by the Congress of South African Trade Unions (COSATU), which is currently in a labour/political alliance with the governing African National Congress (ANC) party of Thabo Mbeki (since succeeded by Jacob Zuma).

Dispute
The strike arose out of demands by South Africa's trade unions to raise the pay for civil servants by no less than 12%. The government offered a 7.25% pay raise, which the trade unions refused to accept.

See also
 2007 in South Africa

References

South African Public Servants Strike, 2007
General strikes in Africa
Labour disputes in South Africa
South African Public Servants Strike, 2007